Diverticular disease is when problems occur due to diverticulosis, a condition defined by the presence of pouches in the wall of the large intestine (diverticula). This includes diverticula becoming inflamed (diverticulitis) or bleeding. Colonic perforation due to diverticular disease may be classified using the Hinchey Classification.

Signs and symptoms
The signs and symptoms of diverticulitis are as follows:
Nausea and vomiting.
Fever
Abdominal tenderness
Constipation
Diarrhea
Pain, may be persistent for days. Pain is usually most felt at the right side of the abdomen, by people of Asian descent.

Causes
The causes of Diverticular disease can be classified into:
Diverticula: This occurs when the weak tissues around the colon tear under pressure. Pouches of marble size protrude through the colon wall as a result of this breakaway.
Diverticulitis: This is a direct result of the tear in diverticula, causing inflammation.

Risk Factors
Several factors contribute to the increased risk factor for diverticulitis:

A diet that is low in fibre and high in fat may increase the risk of developing diverticular disease

Other factors are obesity, lack of exercise or physical inactivity, smoking, genetic disorders.

Diagnosis
Tenderness can be noticed over the inflamed tissues and an elevation of white blood cell counts is also observed after an examination by a physician. This inflammation is typically in the lower left abdomen. CT scan is the most appropriate method used for diagnosis.

References

Diseases of intestines